Nosaina Pokana (born 12 April 1996) is a Papua New Guinean cricketer. He made his Twenty20 International (T20I) debut on 6 February 2016 against Ireland in Australia. He made his List A debut in the 2015–17 ICC World Cricket League Championship on 30 May 2016 against Kenya. He made his One Day International (ODI) debut on 31 March 2017 against the United Arab Emirates in the 2015–17 ICC World Cricket League Championship. He made his first-class debut on 7 April 2017, also against the United Arab Emirates, in the 2015–17 ICC Intercontinental Cup.

In January 2018, the International Cricket Council (ICC) found his bowling action to be illegal, and was suspended from bowling in international cricket as a result. In August 2018, he was named in Papua New Guinea's squad for Group A of the 2018–19 ICC World Twenty20 East Asia-Pacific Qualifier tournament. In March 2019, he was named in Papua New Guinea's squad for the Regional Finals of the 2018–19 ICC World Twenty20 East Asia-Pacific Qualifier tournament. The following month, he was named in Papua New Guinea's squad for the 2019 ICC World Cricket League Division Two tournament in Namibia. In Papua New Guinea's match against Oman, Pokana took his first five-wicket haul in List A cricket. He was the leading wicket-taker for Papua New Guinea in the tournament, with 13 dismissals in six matches.

In June 2019, he was selected to represent the Papua New Guinea cricket team in the men's tournament at the 2019 Pacific Games. In September 2019, he was named in Papua New Guinea's squad for the 2019 ICC T20 World Cup Qualifier tournament in the United Arab Emirates. Ahead of the tournament, the International Cricket Council (ICC) named him as the player to watch in Papua New Guinea's squad.

In August 2021, Pokana was named in Papua New Guinea's squad for the 2021 ICC Men's T20 World Cup.

References

External links
 

1996 births
Living people
Papua New Guinean cricketers
Papua New Guinea One Day International cricketers
Papua New Guinea Twenty20 International cricketers
Place of birth missing (living people)